The Sakonnet people are Native Americans in the United States, related to the Wampanoag people who spoke a dialect of the Massachusett language. The tribal name was applied to Rhode Island's Sakonnet River, Sakonnet Harbor, and other geographic features.

Alternate spellings
The spelling "Sakonnet" has become accepted because of long use on maps, but the name is sometimes written as 'Sekonnet', 'Seaconnet', 'Sakonnet', 'Saconnet', 'Sakonett', or 'Segonet'.

References

Algonquian peoples
Native American tribes in Rhode Island